Sakumono Lagoon is a coastal lagoon in Sakumono near Tema in the Greater Accra Region of Ghana, West Africa. The site covers 1,340 hectares. It was designated as Ramsar wetland site of international importance on 14 August 1992.

Physical features
The site consists broadly of a coastal brackish lagoon whose main habitats are open lagoon, surrounding floodplains, freshwater marsh and coastal savanna grassland, with a narrow connection to the sea.

Fauna
The site receives rare and endangered migratory bird species and several fish species.

References

Lagoons of Ghana
Ramsar sites in Ghana